Sneek is a railway station in Sneek, Netherlands. The station opened on 16 June 1883 and is located on the Leeuwarden–Stavoren railway. Until the line was finished in 1885, this station was the terminus. In 1921 a connection was made with the tramway running between Sneek and Bolsward, which stopped in 1968. The train services are operated by Arriva.

Train services
The following services currently call at Sneek:
2x per hour local service (stoptrein) Leeuwarden - Sneek (1x per hour at weekends)
1x per hour local service (stoptrein) Leeuwarden - Sneek - Stavoren

Bus services
The following bus services depart from the bus station outside the station:

 33 - Sneek - Scharnegoutum - Boazum - Wiuwert - Easterlittens - Baard - Winsum - Wjelsryp - Tzum - Franeker. - Arriva, 1x per hour, Monday to Friday
 42 - Sneek - N354 - Lemmer - Rutten / Creil - Espel - Emmeloord. - Arriva, 2x per hour, Daily. 1x per hour via Rutten and 1x per hour via Creil and Espel.
 45 - Sneek - Hommerts - Woudsend - Elahuizen - Oudega - Hemelum. - Arriva, 1x per hour, not between 9am and 14.30, Daily
 46 - Sneek - Hommerts - (Heeg - Gaastmeer) - Oudega. - Arriva, 1x per hour, Monday - Saturday
 47 - Sneek - Hommerts - Woudsend - Balk - Sondel - Nijemirdum - Rijs - Hemelum. - Arriva, 1-3x per hour, Daily
 93 - Leeuwarden - Deinum - Boksum - Jellum - Bears - Weidum - Jorwert - Mantgum - Easterwierrum - Sneek. - Arriva, 1x per hour, Monday to Saturday
 94 - Sneek - Goenga - Raerd - Reduzum - Leeuwarden - Arriva, 1x per hour, Monday to Friday
 98 - Makkum - Wons - Bolsward - Sneek - Joure - Oudehaske - Heerenveen NS. - Arriva, 2x per hour (Bolsward - Heerenveen), 1x per hour (Bolsward - Makkum), Daily
 99 - Harlingen - Kimswerd - Arum - Witmarsum - Bolsward - Sneek -  Joure - Heerenveen NS. - Arriva, 2x per hour, Daily

See also
 List of railway stations in Friesland

Railway stations in Friesland
Railway stations opened in 1883